Vulpecula  is a faint constellation in the northern sky. Its name is Latin for "little fox", although it is commonly known simply as the fox. It was identified in the seventeenth century, and is located in the middle of the Summer Triangle (an asterism consisting of the bright stars Deneb, Vega, and Altair).

Features

Stars

There are no stars brighter than 4th magnitude in this constellation. The brightest star in Vulpecula is Alpha Vulpeculae, a magnitude 4.44m red giant at a distance of 297 light-years. The star is an optical binary (separation of 413.7") that can be split using binoculars. The star also carries the traditional name Anser, which refers to the goose the little fox holds in its jaws.

23 Vulpeculae is the second brightest star in the constellation.

In 1967, the first pulsar, PSR B1919+21, was discovered in Vulpecula by Jocelyn Bell, supervised by Antony Hewish, in Cambridge. While they were searching for scintillation of radio signals of quasars, they observed pulses which repeated with a period of 1.3373 seconds. Terrestrial origin of the signal was ruled out because the time it took the object to reappear was a sidereal day instead of a solar day. This anomaly was finally identified as the signal of a rapidly rotating neutron star. Fifteen years after the first pulsar was discovered, the first millisecond pulsar, PSR B1937+21, was also discovered in Vulpecula, only a few degrees in the sky away from PSR B1919+21.

Vulpecula is also home to HD 189733 b, one of the closest extrasolar planets studied by the now-retired Spitzer Space Telescope. On 12 July 2007 the Financial Times (London) reported that the chemical signature of water vapour was detected in the atmosphere of this planet. Although HD 189733b with atmospheric temperatures rising above 1,000 °C is far from being habitable, this finding increases the likelihood that water, an essential component of life, would be found on a more Earth-like planet in the future.

Also located in Vulpecula is soft gamma repeater SGR 1935+2154. In 2020 it emitted a fast radio burst, the first one to be observed in the Milky Way.

Deep-sky objects

The Dumbbell Nebula (M27), is a large, bright planetary nebula which was discovered by the French astronomer Charles Messier in 1764 as the very first object of its kind. It can be seen with good binoculars in a dark sky location, appearing as a dimly glowing disk approximately 8 arcminutes in diameter. The nebula is approximately 9,800 years old. A telescope reveals its double-lobed shape, similar to that of an hourglass. Brocchi's Cluster (Collinder 399) is an asterism formerly thought to be an open cluster. It is also called "the Coathanger" because of its distinctive star pattern when viewed with binoculars or a low power telescope.

NGC 7052 is an elliptical galaxy in Vulpecula at a distance of 214 million light-years from Earth. It has a central dusty disk with a diameter of 3700 light-years; there is a supermassive black hole with a mass of 300 million solar masses in its nucleus. Astronomers surmise that the disk is the remnant of a smaller galaxy that merged with NGC 7052. Jets can be seen emanating from the galaxy, and it has very strong radio emissions. This means that it is also classified as a radio galaxy.

The eastern part of Vulpecula is occupied by the Hercules–Corona Borealis Great Wall. It is a galaxy filament, with the length of 3,000 megaparsecs, making it the largest structure in the universe.

History

In the late 17th century, the astronomer Johannes Hevelius created Vulpecula. It was originally known as Vulpecula cum ansere ("the little fox with the goose") or Vulpecula et Anser ("the little fox and the goose"), and was illustrated with a goose in the jaws of a fox. Hevelius did not regard the fox and the goose to be two separate constellations, but later the stars were divided into a separate Anser and Vulpecula. Today, they have been merged again under the name of the fox, but the goose is remembered by the name of the star α Vulpeculae: Anser.

See also
3C 433
Vulpecula (Chinese astronomy)

References

Sources
  also available from Princeton University Press, Princeton: .

Footnotes

External links

The Deep Photographic Guide to the Constellations: Vulpecula
Vulpecula page at SEDS (Students for the Exploration and Development of Space)
M-27 page at SEDS
Star Tales - Vulpecula

 
Northern constellations
Mythological foxes
Constellations listed by Johannes Hevelius